Harpendyreus juno is a butterfly in the family Lycaenidae. It is found in southern Tanzania, northern Malawi and Zambia.

References

Butterflies described in 1897
Harpendyreus
Butterflies of Africa
Taxa named by Arthur Gardiner Butler